"Missin' You: It Will Break My Heart" is the 14th overall single released by singer Ken Hirai. It was released on January 30, 2002 under the label DefSTAR Records. 
"Missin' You: It Will Break My Heart" was featured on Hirai's 5th studio album, Life Is....
The single was produced by American producer Babyface. Babyface announced that the single would be released on May 22, 2002 under BMG Japan.

Track list
Missin' You: It Will Break My Heart　(4:50) 
Written by Ken Hirai. Composed by Babyface.
It Will Break My Heart: English Version (4:50)
Written and Composed by Babyface.
It Will Break My Heart: Instrumental
When Can I See You (4:05)
Written and Composed by Babyface.
Kiss of Life (S.O.U.L.remix=Sound of Urban London=)　(4:30)
Written by Ken Hirai. Composed by Ken Hirai and Masahito Nakano. Remixed by Shiro Sagisu for Ro-Jam.

Ken Hirai songs
2002 singles
Songs written by Ken Hirai
Songs written by Babyface (musician)
Defstar Records singles